Alpujarra Granadina is a Spanish comarca in the Province of Granada. Along with Alpujarra Almeriense, it forms the historical region of the Alpujarras.

Overview 
Located in the west of the Alpujarras, it borders the Granadan comarcas of Accitania (Guadix) to the north, the Vega de Granada to the northwest, the Valle de Lecrín to the west, and the Costa Tropical to the south, as well as the Almerían comarcas of Poniente Almeriense to the southeast and the Alpujarra Almeriense to the east.

Subdivision
The comarca is divided into 25 municipalities (municipios). (2014 populations shown in parentheses):

Almegíjar (361)
Alpujarra de la Sierra (1,065)
Bérchules (762)
Bubión (315)
Busquístar (296)
Cádiar (1545)
Cáñar (408)
Capileira (496)
Carataunas (209)
Cástaras (242)
Juviles (134)
Lanjarón (3,717)
Lobras (165)
Murtas (541)
Nevada (1,149)
Órgiva (5,393)
Pampaneira (323)
Pórtugos (382)
Soportújar (320)
La Taha (663)
Torvizcón (710)
Trevélez (792)
Turón (289)
Ugíjar (2,619)
Válor (623)

See also
Alpujarra Almeriense
Morisco Revolt
Sierra Nevada

References

External links

Visit Alpujarras: your holiday quide, travel information and rural accommodation
 Touristic website of Alpujarra Granadina
 History, pictures and infos about the Alpujarras

Comarcas of the Province of Granada